A practicum (also called work placement, especially in the UK) is an undergraduate or graduate-level course, often in a specialized field of study, that is designed to give students supervised practical application of a previously or concurrently studied field or theory. Practicums (student teaching) are common for education, mental health counselor, and social work majors. In some cases, the practicum may be a part-time student teaching placement that occurs the semester before a student's full-time student teaching placement.

The process resembles an internship; however, a practicum focuses on observation over work experience. In the case of student teaching placements within the United States, students gain insight into the professional responsibilities of classroom teachers by working under the direct supervision of experienced, state-licensed educators. Student educators work directly with cooperating teachers to plan and implement effective lessons using a variety of teaching strategies and methods to provide differentiated instruction within classrooms and meet the needs of diverse students. To ensure the safety of students and faculty members, background checks are required and must be completed before any teaching candidate can begin their practicum experience.

References

Training